Abbots Langley is a large village and civil parish in the English county of Hertfordshire. It is an old settlement and is mentioned (under the name of Langelai) in the Domesday Book. Economically the village is closely linked to Watford and was formerly part of the Watford Rural District. Since 1974 it has been included in the Three Rivers district.

History
This village has had a long history of human habitation. The first traces of human habitation in the area were recorded by archaeologist Sir John Evans (1823–1908).

In 1045 the Saxon thegn Ethelwine 'the Black' granted the upper part of Langlai to St Albans Abbey as Langlai Abbatis (Latin for Langlai of the Abbot, hence 'Abbot's Langley') the remainder being the king's Langlai. By the time of the Domesday Book in 1086 the village was inhabited by 19 families.

The area was split into four manors: Abbots Langley, Langleybury, Chambersbury, and Hyde. In 1539, Henry VIII seized Abbots Langley and sold it to his military engineer Sir Richard Lee. The Manor of Abbots Langley was bequeathed by Francis Combe in his will of 1641 jointly to Sidney Sussex College, Cambridge and Trinity College, Oxford.
The manors of Langleybury and Chambersbury passed through the Ibgrave and Child families, and in 1711 were conveyed to Sir Robert Raymond then Solicitor General later Attorney General and Lord Chief Justice of the King's Bench. On the death of his son without issue in 1756 the manors passed to the Filmer family.
The Manor of Hyde passed to Edward Strong in 1714, through his daughter to Sir John Strange, who left the manor to be shared between his children and their descendents (including Admiral Sir George Strong Nares) and then to the possession of F.M. Nares & Co which sold the estate to the British Land Company in 1858.

On Tibbs Hill Road there is a well-preserved example of a Prince Albert's Model Cottage. The original design and construction was for the Great Exhibition of 1851, to demonstrate model housing for the poor. Subsequently, the design was replicated in several other locations, including Abbots Langley.

Kitters Green developed as a separate hamlet by Manor House. The land between Kitters Green and Abbots Langley was bought from the estate of Sarah Smith by the British Land Company in 1866. It laid out plots for development along Adrian, Breakspear, Garden and Popes roads. The development of these plots led to the merger of the two settlements and the loss of Kitters Green's separate identity.

Sport
Abbots Langley Cricket Club and Langleybury Cricket Club are both based in the village. There are a number of football clubs, including Abbots Langley F.C., Ecocall F.C., Evergreen, Everett Rovers, and Bedmond F.C.

People

Manuel Almunia (born 1977), former professional footballer.
Nick Blinko (born 1961), artist and singer/songwriter/guitarist of Rudimentary Peni.
Pope Adrian IV (–1159), born in Abbots Langley as Nicholas Breakspear.
James Cecil, 1st Marquess of Salisbury (1748–1823) probably lived at Cecil Lodge 1760s–80.
Violet Cressy-Marcks (1895–1970), explorer and journalist, lived at Hazelwood (now Hunton Park) 1930–70.
David Crighton, (1942–2000), mathematician, educated at Abbots Langley primary school.
Joan Evans (art historian) (1893–1977), historian of mediaeval art.
John Evans (archaeologist) (1823–1908), archaeologist and geologist, married and buried, St Lawrence Church, Abbots Langley.
Elizabeth Greenhill, (1615–1679), mother of 37 single births and one set of twins.
Thomas Greenhill (1669–1740), surgeon to Henry Howard, 7th Duke of Norfolk and 39th and last child of Elizabeth Greenhill.
Michael Gregsten (1924–1961), physicist at the Road Research Laboratory, victim of James Hanratty in the 1961 "A6 murder" for whose death he hanged.
Ollie Halsall (1949–1992), influential rock/jazz guitarist and vibraphone player, lived here and recorded an album titled "Abbot's Langley" in 1980.
Robert Kindersley, 1st Baron Kindersley (1871–1954), businessman, stockbroker, merchant banker, and public servant, lived at Langley House 1906–23.
Hugh Kindersley, 2nd Baron Kindersley (1899–1976)
Joe Lane (1892–1959), former professional footballer.
Marghanita Laski (1915–88), journalist and novelist, lived at Abbots House 1937–45.
Eryl McNally, former Labour MEP.
Henry Montagu, 6th Baron Rokeby (1798–1883), soldier, lived at Hazelwood 1838–86.
James Vincent Murphy, (1880–1946), propagandist for Hitler that translated Mein Kampf while resident in Abbots Langley
Robert Raymond, 1st Baron Raymond (1673–1733), politician and judge, lived at Langleybury 1711–33.
Haile Selassie (1892–1975), spent the early part of his exile from Ethiopia at Hazelwood.
Edward Skoyles (1923–2008) researcher and quantity surveyor.
William Henry Smith (politician) (1825–91), member of the W H Smith station newsagent and bookselling family, lived at Cecil Lodge 1864–70.
George Turnbull (1809–1878), civil engineer (the  "first railway engineer of India"), retired to Rosehill, Abbots Langley.
Bradley Walsh (born 1960), entertainer lived in Breakspear Road.
Mark Walsh (born 1965), professional darts player within the Professional Darts Corporation.
Nicky Stevens (born 1951), singer with The Brotherhood of Man, lived in Abbots Road.
Tom Hardy (Broadcaster) (born 1954), disc-jockey with Radio Caroline in the late 1970s, lived in Parsonage Close.
Liz Kendall (born 1971), Labour MP, lived in Langley Road
Judy Grinham (born 1939), former British competitive swimmer, Olympic gold medallist, and former world record-holder lives in The Crescent.

See also
Bedmond
Garston Manor, a grade II listed Georgian Country House located within the parish
Hunton Bridge
Kings Langley
Langleybury
Leavesden Hospital

References
Footnotes

Notes

External links

Abbots Langley Parish Council
History and Development of Abbots Langley Parish Church
 A History of the County of Hertford: Abbots Langley
Abbots Langley (A Guide to Old Hertfordshire)

Villages in Hertfordshire
Three Rivers District
Civil parishes in Hertfordshire